An Ik-soo (Hangul: 안익수,  or  ; born 6 May 1965) is a South Korean football manager and former player.

Early life 
An started to learn football professionally when he was 18 years old and a second-year student in high school. He was accepted to one of the prominent universities in South Korea Chung-Ang University through his academic performance, but he joined Incheon National University to continue his football career.

Club career 
He became a founding member of professional club Ilhwa Chunma in 1989 despite starting football very late. Furthermore, he became one of the best defenders in the K League, helping Ilhwa win three consecutive titles from 1993 to 1995. In 1994, he played five friendlies for the South Korea national football team prior to the 1994 FIFA World Cup due to his performances. He was also selected for the national team for the 1994 World Cup, but didn't appear in World Cup matches.

However, Ilhwa sold An to Pohang Steelers after the 1995 season because they thought he was old enough to deteriorate his ability, although he led them to Asian Club Championship title and K League title that year. Interestingly, An was named the MVP of the Asian Club Championship after defeating his former club Ilhwa in the final of the next tournament.

Career statistics

Club

International

Honours

Player
Kookmin Bank
Korean President's Cup runner-up: 1988

Ilhwa Chunma
Asian Club Championship: 1995
K League 1: 1993, 1994, 1995
Korean League Cup: 1992

Pohang Steelers
Asian Club Championship: 1996-97, 1997-98
 Korean FA Cup: 1996
Korean League Cup runner-up: 1996, 1997+

Individual
K League 1 Best XI: 1994, 1997, 1998
Asian Club Championship Most Valuable Player: 1996–97
Asian Club Championship Best Defender: 1996–97

Manager
Daekyo Kangaroos
Korean Women's National Championship: 2007

South Korea Universiade (women)
Summer Universiade: 2009

Busan IPark
Korean League Cup runner-up: 2011

References

External links
 
 
 

1965 births
Living people
Association football defenders
South Korean footballers
South Korea international footballers
South Korean football managers
Gimcheon Sangmu FC players
Goyang KB Kookmin Bank FC players
Seongnam FC players
Pohang Steelers players
K League 1 players
1994 FIFA World Cup players
South Korea women's national football team managers
Busan IPark managers
Seongnam FC managers
FC Seoul managers
FC Seoul non-playing staff